Mi Vida (My life) is the title of the studio album released by Mexican pop singer José José in 1982. The main hits of the album were: "Mi vida", "Contigo no", "Siempre te vas", "Nunca sabrán" and "Desesperado". José José continued positioned as one of the top sellers of records in Latin America. The album earned six Gold and one Platinum albums.

Track listing

Musical arrangement and direction
1,7,9: Rafael Pérez Botija
3,6,10: Michel Colombier
2,11: Clare Fischer
4,5,8: Armando Noriega
12: Oscar Castro Neves

See also
List of best-selling Latin albums

1982 albums
José José albums
Spanish-language albums